Höchstädt may refer to:
Höchstädt an der Donau
Höchstädt im Fichtelgebirge